Hillingdon Civic Centre is a municipal building in the High Street, Uxbridge. The civic centre, which is the headquarters of Hillingdon London Borough Council, is a Grade II listed building.

History
For much of the 20th century Uxbridge Urban District Council held its meetings in the Second Court of the Uxbridge Courthouse. After, the urban district became a municipal borough in 1955 and the area then became the centre of a London borough in 1965, civic leaders decided to procure a purpose-built civic centre. The site they selected had been occupied by an office building erected by Middlesex County Council.

The new building, which was designed by Andrew Derbyshire, was acclaimed as one of the most famous buildings in the British neo-vernacular style. It was planned from 1970 and the construction work, which was undertaken by Higgs and Hill at a cost of £5.6 million, started in January 1973. It opened in stages from 1976 with a formal opening by the chairman of the British Airports Authority, Norman Payne, on 28 April 1979.

Derbyshire's design envisaged a diamond-shaped building to the west containing the offices of the council officers and their departments and a more irregular shaped building to the east containing the public areas including the council chamber, the civic suite and register office. The main frontage to the public areas, facing onto the High Street, featured a loggia with eight entrances and a steep roof, with a two-storey block with a clock tower behind. The design made extensive use of brick and tile, to pay homage to traditional homely brick architecture of nearby buildings and suburban developments that were "indigenous to the borough". It was designated a Grade II Listed Building in April 2018.

Despite its listed status, the building has had a mixed reception from architectural critics. In his 2012 essay Post Modernism to Ghost Modernism Jonathan Meades argued the building was symbolic of the political climate of its era and highlighted it as an early example of a more populist, conservative style of architecture which aspired to be inoffensive but instead came across as patronising. He concluded that “the proudly vaunting philistinism which has afflicted Britain for three decades found its first architectural expression at Hillingdon.”

A distinctive yew wood sculpture, designed by John Phillips, made up of fourteen pieces of wood suspended on a wire rope, was hung in the stair well leading up to council chamber.

References

London Borough of Hillingdon
1979 establishments in England
Buildings and structures in the London Borough of Hillingdon
Uxbridge
City and town halls in London
Government buildings completed in 1979